Kevin Michael "GG" Allin (born Jesus Christ Allin; August 29, 1956 – June 28, 1993) was an American musician who performed and recorded with various music groups during his career. Allin was known for his controversial live performances, which often featured transgressive acts, including self-mutilation, defecating on stage, and assaulting audience members, for which he was arrested and imprisoned on multiple occasions. AllMusic called him "the most spectacular degenerate in rock n' roll history", while G4TV's That's Tough labelled him the "toughest rock star in the world".

Known more for his notorious stage antics than for his music, Allin recorded prolifically, not only in the punk rock genre, but also in spoken word, country, and more traditional-style rock. His lyrics often expressed themes of violence and misanthropy.

Allin's music was often poorly recorded and produced, given limited distribution, and met with mostly negative reviews from critics, although he maintained a cult following throughout and after his career. Allin promised for several years that he would commit suicide on stage during one of his concerts, but he instead died from a drug overdose on June 28, 1993, at age 36.

Early life
Allin was born Jesus Christ Allin at Weeks Memorial Hospital in Lancaster, New Hampshire, the younger of two sons born to Merle Colby Allin Sr. (1923–2001) and Arleta Gunther (1936–2019). He was given this name because his father told his wife that Jesus Christ had visited him, and told him that his newborn son would be a great man in the vein of the Messiah. During early childhood, Allin's older brother Merle Jr. was unable to pronounce "Jesus" properly and called him "Jeje", which became "GG".

Allin's family lived in a log cabin with no running water or electricity in Groveton, New Hampshire. His father was an abusive religious fanatic who threatened his family with death, digging graves in their cellar and threatening to fill them in the near future. In an essay titled "The First Ten Years", Allin wrote that Merle Sr. wanted to kill his family in a murder–suicide. He "despised pleasure" and allowed his family "very little contact with others". They lived a "primitive existence" and "were more like prisoners than a family". Allin also stated that his mother attempted to escape before she filed for divorce, but Merle Sr. thwarted the attempt by kidnapping Allin. Allin said that he was glad to experience such an upbringing, and that it "made [him] a warrior soul at an early age."

In 1961, Arleta filed for divorce from Merle Sr., as his mental instability was worsening. Allin and his brother were from that time raised by their mother and stepfather, and settled in East St. Johnsbury, Vermont, in 1966. Allin, a poor student, was placed in special education classes and required to repeat the third grade. According to his older brother, he experienced bullying by fellow students for nonconformity. In his second year of high school, he began attending school cross-dressed, which he said was inspired by the New York Dolls. When asked about his childhood, Allin said that it was "very chaotic. Full of chances and dangers. We sold drugs, stole, broke into houses, cars. Did whatever we wanted to for the most part – including all the bands we played in. People even hated us back then."

Recording career

Early years
Allin's earliest influences were 1960s British Invasion bands including Mott the Hoople and the Dave Clark Five. In the early 1970s, Alice Cooper had an important influence on Allin. Allin's earliest recorded musical endeavors were as a drummer. He also wrote most of his songs on an acoustic guitar. In his mid-teens, he and his older brother Merle, who plays bass guitar, formed their first band, Little Sister's Date, which lasted a little over a year. The group covered songs by Aerosmith, Kiss, and other popular rock acts at the time. Both Allin and Merle gained a strong interest in punk rock. The MC5 and The Stooges were major influences on Allin.

He graduated from Concord High School in Concord, Vermont, in 1975, and shortly after formed the band Malpractice with his older brother, local musician Jeff Penney, and Brian Demurs (a high school friend). Allin played the drums for Malpractice until the band separated in 1977.

In 1977, he became a full time member of the punk rock band the Jabbers, which he would front from September 1977 to April 1984. Allin's 1980 debut album was Always Was, Is and Always Shall Be by Orange Records. In addition to singing, he played drums on most tracks. It would be reissued for the first time on CD in 1995 by the Halycon imprint.  At one point, industry veteran and the Dead Boys producer Genya Ravan served as his manager. Tension within the Jabbers mounted as Allin grew uncontrollable, uncompromising, and vicious. The Jabbers disbanded the spring of 1984. Their second to last show was opening for Charged GBH.

Allin fronted many acts during the early to mid-1980s. This includes albums from the Scumfucs, the Texas Nazis, and the Cedar St. Sluts. Allin remained in the underground hardcore punk scene, yet was not part of the East Coast hardcore scene. His performances in Manchester, New Hampshire, earned him the nickname of "the Madman of Manchester".

Allin garnered more mainstream attention with the ROIR cassette-only release of 1987's Hated in the Nation containing tracks from Allin's out-of-print catalog with the Jabbers, the Scumfucs, and the Cedar St. Sluts. The tape also featured several in-studio and in-concert recordings with an all-star band assembled by producer Maximum RocknRoll and early Allin patron Mykel Board. This band featured J Mascis of Dinosaur Jr. on lead guitar and Bongwater record producer/musician Mark Kramer on bass.

Mid-period and more extreme live performances

By the mid-to-late 1980s, Allin was an alcoholic and generally abused any drugs provided to him. 

Allin first defecated onstage in 1985 at a show in Peoria, Illinois. According to fellow performer Bloody Mess, "I was with him when he bought the Ex-Lax. Unfortunately, he ate it hours before the show, so he constantly had to hold it in or he would've shit before he got onstage... After he shit onstage, complete chaos broke out in the hall... All of the old men in charge of the hall went fucking NUTS!.. Hundreds of confused punk kids were flipping out, running out the door, because the smell was INCREDIBLE." Defecation became a regular part of his stage act.

Allin idolized country music legend Hank Williams and saw himself as a kindred spirit. Both were relative loners and outsiders, both were habitual users of intoxicants, both lived with few (if any) possessions, and both traveled the country relentlessly. Allin's acoustic output, documented on the EP The Troubled Troubador, was heavily influenced by Williams. He recorded his own rewrites of Hank Williams Jr.'s "Family Tradition" and David Allan Coe's "Longhaired Redneck", calling his own versions "Scumfuc Tradition" and "Outlaw Scumfuc", respectively. Later, Allin also released another country album, Carnival of Excess, his most refined set of recordings.

During this period, Allin also began performing many spoken word pieces. Video footage of these is available but rare. Unwilling to seek steady employment, Allin supported himself by selling his own records. Allin was also fascinated with serial killers. He wrote to and visited John Wayne Gacy in prison a number of times, and Gacy painted a portrait of Allin, which became the album cover to the soundtrack of the film Hated: GG Allin and the Murder Junkies.

By this point, Allin's performances, which often resulted in considerable damage to venues and sound equipment, were regularly stopped by police or venue owners after only a few songs. Allin was charged with assault and battery or indecent exposure a number of times. His constant touring was only stopped by jail time or by long hospital stays for broken bones, blood poisoning, and other physical trauma.

Another attraction to Allin performances was his continual threats of suicide. In 1989, Allin wrote to Maximum RocknRoll stating that he would commit suicide on stage on Halloween 1989. However, he was in jail when that day came. He continued his threat each following year but ended up imprisoned each following Halloween. When asked why he did not follow through with his threats, Allin stated, "With GG, you don't get what you expect—you get what you deserve." He also stated that suicide should only be done when one had reached one's peak, meeting the afterlife at one's strongest point and not at one's weakest.

In June 1993, Allin made an appearance on The Jane Whitney Show. This interview is infamous for being his last interview and for Allin's aggression toward the audience. Allin openly stated that he would commit suicide and take his fans with him. When questioned by Jane, he clarified that he would make them commit suicide as well or he would kill them. Allin also stated that, at 35, he could sleep with 12-, 13- and 16-year-old girls, boys, and animals, and claimed that he raped both women and men at his concerts.

1989 trial and imprisonment
In late 1989, Allin was arrested and charged with "assault with intent to do great bodily harm less than murder" of a female acquaintance in Ann Arbor, Michigan.

In a psychological evaluation made as part of the trial, Allin was judged as having at least average intelligence, and was described as "courteous, cooperative and candid". The unnamed evaluator noted that Allin did not appear psychotic, and seemed comfortable with his unorthodox lifestyle. However, the evaluator asserted Allin was dependent on alcohol and had a mixed personality disorder with narcissistic, borderline and masochistic features.

Allin initially denied the charges, claiming that the woman was a willing participant in their sexual activities. Allin admitted to cutting her, burning her, and drinking her blood, but insisted that she did the same thing to him. Allin also claimed that inconsistencies in the woman's statements to authorities supported his assertions. The judge in the case agreed there were substantial inconsistencies in the woman's account. Ultimately, however, Allin plea bargained to the reduced charge of felonious assault, and he was imprisoned from December 25, 1989, to March 26, 1991.

It was during this time in prison that Allin began feeling re-energized about his life and "mission". He wrote The GG Allin Manifesto during this period.

Hated documentary and final days

After his release from prison, Allin skipped parole to go on another tour, footage of which was shot for Todd Phillips's documentary Hated: GG Allin and the Murder Junkies. The film contained graphic scenes from a performance Allin gave at the rock club Space at Chase in Manhattan's East Village. A heavily intoxicated Allin stripped naked, defecated on the floor, wiped his feces on himself and threw feces into the audience. He also threw beer bottles, breaking a woman's nose, and assaulted several other people in the crowd. Clips were included from other Allin appearances, as well as interviews with Allin, his band, and their fans. The film was released in 1993 and later followed on DVD in 1997.

In 1991, GG recorded an album entitled Murder Junkies, released by New Rose Records, featuring Antiseen as his backing band. This album contained 10 musical tracks and 10 spoken-word pieces. Other than Freaks, Faggots, Drunks and Junkies, Allin considered this album to be that which most accurately captured his persona and stated philosophy on life. It was also during this period that Allin recorded the album War in My Head – I'm Your Enemy, released on Awareness Records and featuring the band Shrinkwrap. This particular album consists of one 45-minute track that is a collage of spoken-word pieces (mainly from the same recordings as Murder Junkies) which Shrinkwrap put to music.

Allin's growing notoriety led to appearances on various television shows: Geraldo, The Jerry Springer Show and The Jane Whitney Show. At the time of his death, Allin was making plans for a spoken-word album. He also mentioned a somewhat unlikely European tour, enthusiastically talking about it in the hours before his death.

Personal life

Family and relationships
GG Allin married Sandra Farrow on October 6, 1978. They divorced in 1985.

In the mid-1980s, Allin became involved with a teenage girl from Garland, Texas named Tracy Deneault. She became pregnant, and their daughter, Nico Ann Deneault, was born on March 13, 1986. Nico chose to distance herself from her family. Allin and Tracey Deneault never married. At the time of his death, Allin's partner was Liz Mankowski. They appeared together on The Jane Whitney Show, in 1993, with another Allin fan called Wendy.

GG Allin's older brother Merle Allin served as bassist for his last band, the Murder Junkies.

Beliefs
Allin was a self-identified extreme individualist, misanthrope, and anti-authoritarian, promoting lawlessness and violence against police officers in many of his lyrics; his essay, The GG Allin Manifesto, was intended to summarize his personal philosophy. He revealed on Geraldo that he believed his body to be a temple of rock and roll, and that his flesh, blood, and bodily fluids were a communion to the people. Another reason given for his onstage antics (by Dino, the drummer of his band) was that he wanted to draw a parallel between his actions and "a society that's going crazy with violence". He has also said that if he was not a performer, he would probably be a serial killer or a mass murderer.

Allin believed in some form of afterlife. He planned to kill himself onstage on Halloween many times in the late 1980s and early 1990s, but was stopped due to prison sentences around Halloween each year. He explained his views on death in the film Hated: GG Allin and the Murder Junkies, stating: "It's like I've got this wild soul that just wants to get out of this life. It's too confined in this life. I think that to take yourself out at your peak... if you could die at your peak, your strongest point, then your soul will be that much stronger in the next existence."

Death

GG Allin's last show was on June 27, 1993, at a small club called The Gas Station, a punk venue located inside a former gas station at 194 East 2nd Street in Manhattan. In a first-hand account by Michael Bowling, the show ended after three songs, when a melee broke out. Allin ended up outside, leading a group of fans through the neighborhood.

Bowling continued his recount of the evening after the show. After walking the streets for almost an hour, Allin eventually went to Johnny Puke's apartment. There, he and others continued to party and use drugs. Along with Johnny Puke, Allin ingested large amounts of heroin, on which he overdosed and slipped into an unconscious state. Sometime in the early morning of June 28, Allin died from the effects of his heroin overdose. Later that morning, Puke noticed that Allin still lay motionless in the same place where he had left him and posed for Polaroids with the corpse before calling for an ambulance. Allin was pronounced dead at the scene. He was two months short of his 37th birthday.

Funeral
Allin's funeral took place on July 3, 1993, in his native New Hampshire, at the St. Rose Cemetery, Littleton. At his funeral, Allin's bloated corpse was dressed in his black leather jacket and trademark jock strap.  Allin's funeral became a low-level party.

Legacy
Video footage of the soundcheck, concert, and aftermath from Allin's final concert on the day of his death was appended to the 1997 DVD release of Hated.

GG Allin's grave was frequently vandalized with urine, feces, cigarette butts, and alcohol by fans, an act that was greatly discouraged by GG's mother Arleta. His tombstone was removed in 2010 after it was knocked off the base by a fan, GG's brother had just moved and his mother went to Florida for the winter while this happened.

Hank Williams III's 2008 album Damn Right, Rebel Proud features the song "P.F.F.", which features the line "This song is written and dedicated for GG Allin" spoken at the beginning.

On December 13, 2018, Showtime premiered the 2017 documentary GG Allin: All in the Family which documented Allin's life, career and death and how his brother and mother were coping with his death 20 years later.

Wrestler Darby Allin's ring name is derived from the names of GG Allin and Darby Crash.

Discography

 Always Was, Is and Always Shall Be (1980)
 Eat My Fuc (1984)
 You'll Never Tame Me (1985)
 Sing Along Love Songs (1985)
 You Give Love a Bad Name (1987)
 Freaks, Faggots, Drunks and Junkies (1988)
 The Suicide Sessions (1989)
 Beautiful Afterbirth: Fucked & Framed (1990)
 Murder Junkies (1991)
 War in My Head – I'm Your Enemy (1993)
 Brutality and Bloodshed for All (1993)
 Carnival of Excess (1995)

References

Bibliography

Further reading
 Parfrey, Adam. "G. G. Allin: Portrait of the Enemy" in Parfrey, ed. Apocalypse Culture. Los Angeles: Feral House, 1990 (expanded and revised ed), pp. 45–47.

External links

 
 GG Allin Archives – The Scumfuc Repository 
 
 

1956 births
1993 deaths
20th-century American criminals
20th-century American singers
American lyricists
American male drummers
American male guitarists
American male bass guitarists
American male singer-songwriters
American people convicted of assault
American punk rock drummers
American punk rock singers
American rock songwriters
American spoken word artists
Burials in New Hampshire
Criminals from New Hampshire
Deaths by heroin overdose in New York (state)
Drug-related deaths in New York City
Accidental deaths in New York (state)
Homestead Records artists
The Murder Junkies members
Obscenity controversies in music
People from Lancaster, New Hampshire
People from Littleton, New Hampshire
People from St. Johnsbury, Vermont
People with personality disorders
Prisoners and detainees of Michigan
ROIR artists
Self-declared messiahs
Singer-songwriters from New Hampshire
Violence against women in the United States
20th-century American drummers
20th-century American guitarists
20th-century American bass guitarists
20th-century American male singers